Tiaan van Vuuren (born 31 July 2001) is a South African cricketer. He made his first-class debut for Eastern Province in the 2018–19 CSA 3-Day Provincial Cup on 21 March 2019. He made his List A debut for Eastern Province in the 2018–19 CSA Provincial One-Day Challenge on 31 March 2019. In September 2019, he was named in Eastern Province's squad for the 2019–20 CSA Provincial T20 Cup. He made his Twenty20 debut for Eastern Province in the 2019–20 CSA Provincial T20 Cup on 13 September 2019. In December 2019, he was named in South Africa's squad for the 2020 Under-19 Cricket World Cup.

References

External links
 

2001 births
Living people
South African cricketers
Eastern Province cricketers
Place of birth missing (living people)